
Saint Leontius may refer to:

Christian Saints
Leontius of Monemvasia (1377-1452), 15th-century Greek monastic
Leontius of Rostov (c. 1016-c. 1072), Russian monastic and bishop

Bishops
Leontius of Autun, bishop of Autun, died c. 430 AD
Leontius of Caesarea (died 337), bishop of Caesarea,  AD
Leontius of Fréjus (died 488), bishop of Fréjus, died 5th century
Leontius of Saintes, bishop of Saintes, 7th century
Leontius of Camerino, bishop of Camerino, martyred ~250 AD
Leontius the Elder, died c. 541, bishop of Bordeaux

Martyrs
Leontius, Hypatius and Theodulus, died 70-79 AD
Leontius of Tsarevo, Russian bishop killed in 1917
Leontius of Vanand, one of the Leontine martyrs of Persia, killed in 455 AD
Leontius of Constantinople, (with Martyrs Julian, Marcian, John, James, Alexius, Demetrius, Photius, Peter, and Mary, 730, (August 9, Eastern Orthodox liturgics)

See also
Leontius (disambiguation)